Guerrino Rossi (February 2, 1934 – August 19, 1996) was an Italian professional football player and coach. He was born in Monticelli d'Ongina, Province of Piacenza.

References

1934 births
1996 deaths
Sportspeople from the Province of Piacenza
Italian footballers
Serie A players
U.S. Cremonese players
Juventus F.C. players
A.C.N. Siena 1904 players
S.P.A.L. players
Cagliari Calcio players
A.C. Cesena players
Italian football managers
S.S.D. Sanremese Calcio players
Association football forwards
A.C.D. Sant'Angelo 1907 managers
Footballers from Emilia-Romagna